Wasserman or Wassermann is a surname. Notable people with the surname include:
 Aaron E. Wasserman (1920–2015), American food scientist
 Aharon Wasserman (born 1986), American entrepreneur and software designer
 Al Wasserman (born 1921), American film maker
 Anatoly Wasserman (born 1952), Russian journalist and political pundit
 Antony Wassermann (born 1957), British mathematician
 August von Wassermann (1866–1925), German bacteriologist
 Bob Wasserman (1934–2011), American politician and police chief, Mayor of Fremont, California
 Cale Wassermann (born 1983), American soccer coach
 Casey Wasserman (born 1974), American entertainment executive and owner of the Los Angeles Avengers
 Dale Wasserman (19142008), American playwright
 Dan Wasserman, American political cartoonist
 Dave Wasserman (born 1984), American political analyst
 Debbie Wasserman Schultz (born 1966), American politician from Florida
 Dora Wasserman (1919–2003), actress and founder of the Dora Wasserman Yiddish Theatre in Montreal
 Edward Wasserman, American professor of psychology at the University of Iowa
 Ehren Wassermann (born 1980), American baseball pitcher
 Elchonon Wasserman (1874–1941), Lithuanian rabbi and rosh yeshiva
 Eva Wasserman-Margolis, American composer, conductor and clarinet player
 Gordon Wasserman, Baron Wasserman (born 1938), member of the UK House of Lords
 Harvey Wasserman (born 1945), American journalist
 Jack Wasserman (1927–1977), Canadian newspaper columnist
 Jakob Wassermann (1873–1934), German writer and novelist
 James Wasserman (1948–2020), American author and occultist
 Jeffrey Wasserman (1946–2006), American artist
 Jerry Wasserman (born 1945), American actor
 John L. Wasserman (1938–1979), American entertainment critic for the San Francisco Chronicle from 1964 – 1979
 Kathryn Wasserman Davis (1907–2013), American philanthropist and foundation executive
 Kevin 'Noodles' Wasserman (born 1963), American lead guitarist and background vocalist for The Offspring
 Kimberly Wasserman, American environmentalist
 Larry A. Wasserman, Canadian statistician
 Lew Wasserman (1913–2002), American film and entertainment agent and studio executive
 Mel Wasserman (1932–2002), American businessman, entrepreneur and founder of CEDU Education
 Noam T. Wasserman, American academic
 Oscar Wassermann (1869–1934), German banker
 Paul Wasserman (1934–2007), American entertainment publicist
 Philip Wasserman (1828–1895), mayor of Portland, Oregon
 Rick D. Wasserman (born 1973), American actor
 Rob Wasserman (1952–2016), American composer and bass player
 Robert Wasserman (disambiguation), several people
 Robin Wasserman (born 1978), American novelist
 Ron Wasserman (born 1961), American composer
 Ruth Wasserman Lande (born 1976), Israeli diplomat, lecturer and social activist
 Sandra Wasserman (born 1970), Belgian tennis player
 Sheldon Wasserman (born 1961), Wisconsin State Assembly member
 Simcha Wasserman (1899–1992), Rabbi/Educator, founder of several schools (France, USA, Israel)
 Stanley Wasserman (born 1951), American statistician
 Suzanne Wasserman (1957–2017), American film director, historian and writer
 Tony Wasserman, American computer scientist
 Václav Wasserman (1898–1967), Czechoslovak screenwriter, film actor and director
 Wald Wassermann (born 1972), Belgian-born American physicist
 Walter Wassermann (1883–1944), German screenwriter
 Zbigniew Wassermann (1949–2010), Polish politician

See also 
 Jakob-Wassermann-Literaturpreis, a Bavarian literary prize
 Toppo Wassermann College, a boarding school in Udine, Italy
 Wasserman 9-Panel Plot, a graphical representation of cardiopulmonary exercise testing data
 Wasserman radar, a long-range, height finder radar built by Germany during World War II
 Wassermann Lake, a lake in Minnesota, United States
 Wassermann test, a complement-fixation antibody test for syphilis, named after August von Wassermann
 
 

German-language surnames

hr:Vodenjak
la:Aquarius (discretiva)
nl:Aquarius